Kevin Ken Tsujihara (born October 25, 1964) is an American businessman, and former chairman and CEO of Warner Bros Entertainment. He succeeded Barry Meyer as CEO in March 2013, and as chairman in December 2013, having previously served as president of Warner Bros. Home Entertainment. Upon assuming the role of CEO, Tsujihara became the first Asian American to run a major film studio.

Early life 
Kevin Tsujihara was born to Shizuo and Miyeko "Mickey" Tsujihara and grew up in Petaluma, California. He is of Japanese American heritage. He and his family owned Empire Egg Company, a company that distributed eggs to markets across the San Francisco Bay area. Tsujihara graduated from the University of Southern California with a bachelor's degree in accounting, and subsequently earned an MBA degree from Stanford Graduate School of Business. After graduating from Stanford, he and some former classmates launched QuickTax Inc., a tax preparation company.

Career 

Tsujihara joined Warner Bros. Entertainment, Inc. in 1994 as the director of special projects finance, primarily dealing with the company's interest in Six Flags Theme Parks, which had been acquired by Warner Bros.' parent company Time Warner (now WarnerMedia) in 1990. While employed at Warner Bros., he also focused on business development and online content. In 2005, Tsujihara was given the position of president of the Warner Bros. Home Entertainment unit, which focuses on the home video, online distribution and video games for the company.

In January 2013, Tsujihara was named the new chief executive officer of Warner Bros. after the announcement that Barry Meyer would retire from the position on March 1, 2013. This made him the first Asian American to be the CEO of a major Hollywood studio and the fifth leader in the 90-year history of Warner Bros.

On March 6, 2019, leaked text messages showed that Kevin Tsujihara had promised auditions and acting jobs to actress Charlotte Kirk in return for sex facilitated by film mogul James Packer in September 2013. WarnerMedia was investigating the allegations. On March 8, 2019, Tsujihara released a memo apologizing to his colleagues at WarnerMedia for his behavior. A statement issued by Tsujihara's attorney stated that Tsujihara "did not have a direct role in the actress being cast in any movie". Tsujihara resigned on March 18, 2019, as chairman and CEO of Warner Bros.

In September 2020 her lawyers filed a petition in the Los Angeles Superior Court to vacate a gag order that has kept her mostly silent amid the years-long battle. The petition paints a picture of Tsujihara engaging in nonconsensual sex. The THR also revealed informations about how Tsujihara and former NBCUniversal Vice Chairman Ronald Meyer colluded to cover up the real nature of their relationships with Kirk, reached settlement and court cases.

Personal life 
Tsujihara and his wife, Sandy, have two children. Tsujihara serves on the Motion Picture & Television Fund (MPTF) Board of Governors.

References

External links 
 

American people of Japanese descent
American film studio executives
Living people
Marshall School of Business alumni
People from Petaluma, California
Stanford Graduate School of Business alumni
University of Southern California alumni
Warner Bros. people
1964 births